Hibbertia rostellata is a species of flowering plant in the family Dilleniaceae and is endemic to the south-west of Western Australia. It was first formally described in 1849 by Nikolai Turczaninow in the Bulletin de la Société Impériale des Naturalistes de Moscou. The specific epithet (rostellata) means "possessing a small beak or snout", referring to the tip of leaves.

This species grows on flats and slopes in the Avon Wheatbelt, Coolgardie, Esperance Plains, Geraldton Sandplains and Mallee biogeographic regions of south-western Western Australia.

See also
List of Hibbertia species

References

rostellata
Flora of Western Australia
Plants described in 1849
Taxa named by Nikolai Turczaninow